Shifnal is a civil parish in Shropshire, England.  It contains 78 listed buildings that are recorded in the National Heritage List for England.  Of these, one is listed at Grade I, the highest of the three grades, three are at Grade II*, the middle grade, and the others are at Grade II, the lowest grade.  The parish contains the market town of Shifnal and the surrounding countryside.  In the town, most of the listed buildings are houses, cottages, shops, and public houses and hotels, the earliest of which are timber framed or have timber-framed cores.  The other listed buildings in the town include a church, items in the churchyard, a former workhouse, and a bank.  Outside the town are four country houses, which are listed together with associated structures, and the other listed buildings include farmhouses and farm buildings, houses and cottages, two bridges, and a former watermill and associated buildings.


Key

Buildings

References

Citations

Sources

Lists of buildings and structures in Shropshire
Listed buildings